Wonderbly, previously Lost My Name, is a technology and publishing business that produces personalized books for children and adults. Launched in 2012, Wonderbly has sold over 7 million books in over two hundred countries.

Products 
The initial product published by Wonderbly, The Little Boy/Girl Who Lost His/Her Name, is a personalised picture book for readers whose age ranges between two and six years old. The book tells of a child who has lost their name and goes on an adventure to find it. Each book comprises a selection of mini stories, each of which feature the letters of the child's missing name.

The Little Boy/Girl Who Lost His/Her Name has been translated into British English, American English, German, French, Spanish, Italian, Dutch, Chinese and Japanese.

Wonderbly followed this up with The Incredible Intergalactic Journey Home, a picture book personalised around a child's address that featured a satellite image of their real home.

Wonderbly's third title, Kingdom of You, is a personalised picture book based on a child's favourite things.

Most recently Wonderbly released The Birthday Thief, which uses a child's birthdate as its narrative structure.

History 
Wonderbly was founded by Asi Sharabi, former advertising exec; Tal Oron, creative technologist; David Cadji-Newby, a television writer and novelist; and Pedro Serapicos, an illustrator and graphic designer. The company is currently headquartered in East London.

In June 2015, Wonderbly announced a $9 million Series A round, led by Google Ventures, and in July 2017, another $8.5 million Series B round led by Ravensburger. The company also underwent a rebrand from Lost My Name to Wonderbly in the same month.

Recognition 

The company won recognition in Series 12 of BBC's Dragon’s Den, where two of the co-founders appeared on British and Australian television to secure a record breaking investment.

Awards

2014 
 Best Start Up, FutureBook Innovation Awards
 Startups Award, People's Champion
 Silver winner for Best Children's Story 3 to 5 Years (The Little Boy/Girl Who Lost His/Her Name), Loved by Parents 
 Bronze winner for Best Children's Story Preschool (The Little Boy/Girl Who Lost His/Her Name), Loved by Parents

2015 
 Winner of the Self Published Books category, British Book Design and Production Awards   
 Shortlisted for Digital Business of the Year, Bookseller Industry Awards

2016 
 Future Fifty, Tech City UK 
 The Top 50 Innovative Companies in the United Kingdom, Innovative Business Awards 
 Gold winner for Innovative Book of the Year (The Incredible Intergalactic Journey Home), Junior Design Awards 
 The Leap 100, City AM 
 Top 10 Most Innovative Companies in Media, Fast Company 
 Most Innovative Companies For Parents & Kids, Fatherly 
 One to Watch, Sunday Times Tech Track 100 
 Shortlisted for Best E-Commerce Startup, The Europas Conference & Awards 
 BAFTA nominee for the Original Interactive category (Blinkies), BAFTA

2017 
 Silver winner for Best designed/illustrated book for children (Kingdom of You), Junior Design Awards
 Rank #1, Sunday Times Tech Track 100

References

Publishing companies established in 2013